William A. Johnson Jr. is an American politician who served as the 64th Mayor of the City of Rochester, New York. He was the first African-American mayor in the city's history.

Early life and education
Johnson is a native of Lynchburg, Virginia. He earned a B.A. and M.A. in Political Science from Howard University.

Career 
Prior to his election as mayor, Johnson served for 21 years as the President and Chief Executive Officer of the Urban League of Rochester, responsible for developing and overseeing programs and project in education, youth development, family services, employment training, and affordable housing.

Tenure 
He was first elected in November 1993, receiving over 72 percent of the vote. It was his first run for any political office, and he succeeded a 20-year incumbent. Johnson was the city's first African-American mayor.

In November 1997, Johnson was re-elected without opposition. In November 2001, he was re-elected to a third term with over 78 percent of the vote. Johnson announced during that campaign that he would not seek a fourth term.

In 1999, Johnson was named the United States' Local Public Official of the Year by Governing Magazine. In 2004, he was a finalist for the World Mayor Prize.

Johnson spearheaded the Spirit of Ontario I fast ferry service between Rochester and Toronto. First approved in 2001, the fast ferry service began in 2004 but was plagued by numerous operational and financial issues, stopping service multiple times, until Johnson's successor Robert Duffy shut down the service for good in 2006, with the city selling the Spirit of Ontario in 2007.  The ferry's terminal building in Charlotte, which still stands today, was named after Johnson in 2018, which was seen as an "insult" to his legacy by arch-conservative journalist Bob Lonsberry.

The ferry was not the only initiative that was ended by his successor. As the independent City Mayors think tank wrote, "Upon retirement as Mayor in 2005, Bill Johnson faced an indignity similar to that of other African-American elected officials in the US who instituted programs and policies that upended long-established power relationships. His white successor, a former police chief, dismantled Johnson’s signature accomplishments, most notably ending Rochester’s citizen empowerment program and replacing community policing with an aggressive “zero tolerance” policing strategy."

Johnson retired as Mayor in 2005 and became Distinguished Professor of Public Policy at the Rochester Institute of Technology.

Other political ventures 
In 2003, Johnson ran unsuccessfully for Monroe County Executive on a platform of fiscal responsibility and regional cooperation and innovation. In 2011, after a tumultuous period in which the City of Rochester had three different mayors in three weeks after having only three mayors in the previous thirty-seven years, Johnson ran again for Mayor in a special election to serve the remainder of the term of Robert Duffy, who resigned. As the Independence Party of New York and Working Families Party candidate, Johnson lost to Democrat Tom Richards. Johnson garnered more votes than any previous candidate in New York State on the Working Family Party's ticket.

References

External links
Interview with William A Johnson, June 2020
Biography from City Mayors, April 2005

Mayors of Rochester, New York
African-American mayors in New York (state)
New York (state) Democrats
Rochester Institute of Technology faculty
Howard University alumni
Living people
1942 births
People from Lynchburg, Virginia
21st-century African-American people
20th-century African-American people